"Your Joy Is My Low" is a song by IAMX, taken from his first studio album Kiss + Swallow. It was first released on IAMX's debut promo EP Your Joy Is My Low in Austria during his first tour in June 2004. Only 222 copies were made available. A one track promo CD single was released in 2004 by Belgian label Anorak Supersport.

On 26 May 2005, a remix maxi-single titled Your Joy Is My Low Remixes was released on the Anorak Supersport label (Belgium). Only 500 copies were made available for distribution. It was also released as a digital download. On 10 July 2020 the digital version was re-released as Your Joy Is My Low - EP with the same cover as the EP Your Joy Is My Low from 2004.

Track listing

Your Joy Is My Low (Acute Music, 2004) 

 „Your Joy Is My Low” 5:18
 „You Stick It In Me (Alt Mix)” 4:20
 „This Will Make You Love Again” 4:58
 „I Like Pretending” 5:16

Your Joy Is My Low (Radio Edit) (Anorak Supersport, 2004) 

 „Your Joy Is My Low (Radio Edit)”

Your Joy Is My Low (Mister Torpedo Remix) (Anorak Supersport, 2005) 

 „Your Joy Is My Low (Mister Torpedo Remix)” 6:14

Your Joy Is My Low Remixes (Anorak Supersport, 2005) 

 „Your Joy Is My Low («You Are X Remix» by Thomas Sari)” 5:56
 „Your Joy Is My Low (Soldout Remix)” 4:13
 „Your Joy Is My Low (Mr. Jack Remix)” 4:58
 „Your Joy Is My Low («Rockmixed» by Mister Torpedo)” 6:14

References 

IAMX songs
2005 singles
2004 songs
Songs written by Chris Corner